"Never Recover" is a song by American rappers Lil Baby and Gunna with Canadian rapper Drake. The track was released on October 5, 2018, as the final track on the former two's collaborative album, Drip Harder.

Background 
The song is the second collaboration from Lil Baby and Drake, following their May 2018 single "Yes Indeed".

Critical reception 
Peter A. Berry of XXL commented on Drake going "full Toronto boss mode" on the track, and complimented Lil Baby's verse as "hard".

Charts

Certifications

References 

2018 songs
Lil Baby songs
Drake (musician) songs
Songs written by Drake (musician)
Songs written by Lil Baby
Songs written by Tay Keith
Songs written by Gunna (rapper)
Song recordings produced by Tay Keith
Songs written by Turbo (record producer)
Song recordings produced by Turbo (record producer)
Gunna (rapper) songs